This is a list of people associated with Université Laval.

Noted alumni

Artists and media personalities 
 Victor Bouchard, pianist and composer
 Édith Butler, Acadian singer
 Christiane Chabot, artist
 Gaston Miron, poet and author
 Renée Morisset, pianist
 Ben Mulroney, television host and son of former prime minister Brian Mulroney
 Gilles Vigneault, artist

Athletes 
 Boris Bede, gridiron football player
 Pierre Harvey, Olympic cyclist and cross-country skier
 Pierre Lavertu, CFL player
 Ed Millaire, professional hockey player, Montreal Canadiens

Business leaders 
 Marcel Aubut, president of the Canadian Olympic Committee
 Conrad Black, former media magnate
 Manon Brouillette, President and CEO of Videotron
 Richard Fortin (born 1949/50), former chairman of Couche-Tard
 Louis Garneau, businessman and Olympic cyclist
 Marc Laliberté, CEO of Via Rail Canada
 Jean Leclerc, chairman, Leclerc biscuits and former provincial politician
 Charles Sirois, businessman and venture capitalist

Political Leaders

Canadian 
 Prime Ministers of Canada Louis St. Laurent, Brian Mulroney and Jean Chrétien
 Premiers of Quebec Lucien Bouchard, Pierre-Joseph-Olivier Chauveau, Edmund James Flynn, Jean Lesage, René Lévesque, Pauline Marois, Simon-Napoléon Parent and Louis-Alexandre Taschereau
 Jean-Martin Aussant, former leader of Option nationale party
 Jean Bazin, senator
 Louise Beaudoin, former minister in Quebec
 Lawrence Cannon, Canadian Minister of Foreign Affairs, 2008–2011
 Thomas Chapais, lawyer and federal politician
 Raoul Dandurand, lawyer, federal politician, diplomat, president of the League of Nations Assembly for 1925
 Stéphane Dion, diplomat and former politician; former leader of the Liberal Party of Canada
 Gilbert Finn, 26th Lieutenant Governor of New Brunswick
 Eugène Fiset, former Surgeon General of Canada, 18th Lieutenant Governor of Quebec
 Michael Fortier, senator
 Wilfrid Gariépy, Alberta cabinet minister
 Clement Gignac, politician, former Quebec Minister of Economic Development, Innovation and Export Trade and chief economist at Industrial Alliance
 Daniel Joseph Greene, Premier of Newfoundland, 1894–95
 Michael Meighen, senator
 Christian Paradis
 Louis J. Robichaud, 24th premier of New Brunswick
 Raymond C. Setlakwe, senator
 Arthur Tremblay, senator

Senior public servants 
 Johanne Bélisle, former Commissioner of Patents, Registrar of Trademarks and Chief Executive Officer of the Canadian Intellectual Property Office (CIPO)
 Raymond Chrétien, former diplomat and lawyer
 Ernest Côté, diplomat and civil servant.
 Marc Lortie, diplomat
 Gérard Veilleux, former senior civil servant, president of the Canadian Broadcasting Corporation (1989–1993)
 Jennie Carignan, Brigadier General

Foreign 
 Archduke Carl Ludwig of Austria (1918–2007)
 Archduchess Charlotte of Austria, social worker and royal heiress
 Archduke Rudolf of Austria (1919–2010)
 Mahamat Ali Adoum, permanent representative of Chad to the United Nations; former Minister of foreign affairs (1992–93)
 Jacques-Édouard Alexis, prime minister of Haiti, 1999–2001 and 2006–2008
 Carme Chacón, Spanish Minister of Defence, 2008–2011
 Habiba Zehi Ben Romdhane, Tunisian Minister of health
 Jean, Grand Duke of Luxembourg
 Pearlette Louisy, Governess-General of Saint Lucia, 1997-2017

Jurists 
 Supreme Court Justices Suzanne Côté, Louis LeBel, Claire L'Heureux-Dubé, Charles Fitzpatrick, Arthur Cyrille Albert Malouin, Lawrence Arthur Dumoulin Cannon, Louis-Philippe Pigeon, Julien Chouinard, Robert Taschereau, Henri-Elzéar Taschereau, Thibaudeau Rinfret
 Marcel Crête (fr), jurist and former Chief Justice of Quebec (1980–88)
 Léon Gérin, lawyer and president of the Royal Society of Canada
 Paule Gauthier, lawyer, arbitrator, corporate director, former chair of the Security Intelligence Review Committee 1996–2004
 Frederick Edmund Meredith, lawyer and businessman, 8th chancellor of Bishop's University
 Adolphe-Basile Routhier, judge and writer

Public intellectuals and academics 
 Fabrisia Ambrosio, academic
 Gérard Bouchard, academic and public intellectual
 Thomas De Koninck, philosopher
 Gustave Guillaume, linguist, philologist and Volney Prize laureate
 Yolande Henderson, Pakistani high school teacher
 Richard Hotte, professor of information technology at Université TÉLUQ and current UNESCO Chair in Global Smart Disruptive Learning
 Luc Langlois, philosopher, Ordre des Palmes Académiques laureate, Dean of the Faculty of Philosophy, 2002-2010
 Georges Larivière, researcher, writer, ice hockey coach 
 Laurent Picard, academic, former president of the Canadian Broadcasting Corporation
 Rodrigue Tremblay, economist
 Niklaus Wirth, computer scientist, Turing Award winner

Religious leaders 
 Louis-Nazaire Bégin, Canadian Cardinal of the Roman Catholic Church
 Charles Sandwith Campbell, benefactor of Montreal; Governor of McGill University
 Gérald Lacroix, ISPX, cardinal, archbishop of the Roman Catholic Archdiocese of Quebec and Primate of Canada
 Marc Ouellet, cardinal, prefect of the Congregation for Bishops and president of the Pontifical Commission for Latin America

Scientists and physicians 
 Albéric Boivin, physicist known for his work in optics and lasers
 Claire Deschênes, mechanical engineer and professor of engineering at Laval
 Paul Fiset, microbiologist and developer of the Q fever vaccine
 Paul-Antoine Giguère, physical chemist
 Jean-Charles Gille, engineer, psychiatrist and professor of medicine.
 Larkin Kerwin, physicist, first president of the Canadian Space Agency, 1989–1992
 Fernand Labrie, physician and medical researcher
 Louis de Lotbiniere-Harwood, Dean of Medicine at Université de Montréal; President of the Hôpital Notre-Dame
 Paul Marmet, physicist
 Aimé Pelletier, surgeon; under pen name Bertrand Vac, influential Quebec novelist, particularly in the 1950s
 Ouida Ramón-Moliner, first woman anaesthetist at Université Laval
 Franco Rasetti, physicist and founding chairman of the Laval physics department, 1939–1947
 Jean-Paul Richard, physicist, academic and researcher
 David Saint-Jacques, astrophysicist and astronaut for the Canadian Space Agency
 David Servan-Schreiber, physician and author
 Réjean Thomas (fr), physician and founder of the Canadian division of Médecins du Monde

Rhodes Scholars
 Marius Barbeau 1910
 Edgar Rochette 1914
 Roger Gaudry 1937
 Julien Chouinard 1951
 Thomas De Koninck 1956
 Gregory Kates 1966
 Jean-François Garneau 1982
 Leo Bureau-Blouin 2016

Recipients of honorary degrees
Approximately 1100 honorary doctorates have been granted since 1864. Some notable recipients are:
 Janette Bertrand, journalist and feminist
 Lise Bissonnette, journalist and civil servant
 Marie-Claire Blais, writer
 Henri-Raymond Casgrain, historian and priest
 Céline Dion, singer
 Maurice Duplessis, 16th Premier of Quebec 
 Germaine Guèvremont, writer
 Adélard Godbout, 15th Premier of Quebec 
 Marc-André Hamelin, pianist
 Anne Hébert, writer
 Guy Laliberté, Cirque du Soleil founder
 Jean Lesage, 19th Premier of Quebec 
 Julie Payette, astronaut
 Paul Sauvé, 17th Premier of Quebec
 Yoav Talmi, conductor
 Gilles Vigneault, poet and singer

Rectors 
There has been 25 rectors since the granting of university status in 1852.
 1852–1860 M. l'abbé Louis-Jacques Casault 
 1860–1866 M. l'abbé Elzéar-Alexandre Taschereau 
 1866–1869 Mgr Michel-Édouard Méthot 
 1869–1871 M. l'abbé Elzéar-Alexandre Taschereau 
 1871–1880 Mgr Thomas-Étienne Hamel 
 1880–1883 Mgr Michel-Édouard Méthot 
 1883–1886 Mgr Thomas-Étienne Hamel 
 1886–1887 Mgr Michel-Édouard Méthot 
 1887–1893 Mgr Benjamin Pâquet 
 1893–1899 Mgr Joseph-Clovis-Kemner Laflamme 
 1899–1908 Mgr Olivier-E. Mathieu
 1908–1909 Mgr Joseph-Clovis-Kemner Laflamme 
 1909–1915 Mgr Amédée-Edmond Gosselin 
 1915–1921 Mgr François Pelletier 
 1921 M. l'abbé Pierre Hébert 
 1921–1924 Mgr Charles-Napoléon Gariépy
 1924–1927 Mgr Camille Roy 
 1927–1929 Mgr Amédée-Edmond Gosselin 
 1929 Mgr Camille Roy 
 1929–1932 Mgr Philéas-J. Filion
 1932–1938 Mgr Camille Roy 
 1938–1939 Mgr Arthur Robert
 1939–1940 Mgr Alexandre Vachon
 1940–1943 Mgr Camille Roy 
 1943–1945 Mgr Cyrille Gagnon
 1945–1954 Mgr Ferdinand Vandry
 1954–1960 Mgr Alphonse-Marie Parent 
 1960–1972 Mgr Louis-Albert Vachon 
 1972–1977 Larkin Kerwin 
 1977–1987 Jean-Guy Paquet 
 1987–1997 Michel Gervais 
 1997–2002 François Tavenas 
 2002–2007 Michel Pigeon 
 2007–2017 Denis Brière
 2017–present Sophie D'Amours

References

Université Laval
Education in Quebec City
Laval